Kataiya may refer to:

Kataiya, India
Kataiya, Nepal